Ann-Marit Sæbønes (born 11 December 1945) is a Norwegian politician for the Labour Party.

She was born in Porsgrunn.

She worked as a physiotherapist in Norway and Kenya from 1969 to 1979, and studied sociology at the University of Oslo in 1979.

She served as a deputy representative to the Norwegian Parliament from Oslo between 1985 and 1989. She later became the first female mayor of Oslo, sitting from 1992 to 1995.

Sæbønes is married to Tore Eriksen.

References

1945 births
Living people
Politicians from Porsgrunn
Norwegian physiotherapists
Norwegian expatriates in Kenya
Deputy members of the Storting
Labour Party (Norway) politicians
Mayors of Oslo
University of Oslo alumni
Women mayors of places in Norway
20th-century Norwegian women politicians
20th-century Norwegian politicians
Women members of the Storting